William Leonard Snowden (2 January 1935 – 4 June 2016) was a New Zealand rugby league footballer who represented New Zealand.

Early life
Snowden was born in Auckland on 2 January 1935.

Playing career
Snowden played halfback for the Ponsonby club and represented Auckland, New Zealand Māori and the North Island.

He made his debut for the New Zealand national rugby league team during the 1959 tour of Australia, becoming Kiwi #391, however he did not make his test match debut until 1961, against Australia at Carlaw Park.

Snowden became the New Zealand vice-captain in 1962 before becoming captain in 1965. He retired having played 57 games for New Zealand, including 18 test matches.

Later years
In 1967 he coached the new University of Auckland club in the sixth grade.

Snowden died in Sydney on 4 June 2016.

References

1935 births
2016 deaths
New Zealand rugby league players
New Zealand national rugby league team players
Auckland rugby league team players
Ponsonby Ponies players
Rugby league halfbacks
North Island rugby league team players
New Zealand Māori rugby league team players